Michael Washington Augustis Haynes Jr. (born September 13, 1980) is a former American football defensive end who played five seasons in the National Football League (NFL).

Professional career

He was selected with the 14th overall pick of the 2003 NFL Draft out of Penn State by the Chicago Bears. Haynes was the first player selected by the Bears with their two first round draft picks in 2003. The Bears used their second first round pick, 22nd overall of the 2003 NFL Draft, to select quarterback Rex Grossman. Following the Bears' trade for Adewale Ogunleye, Haynes struggled to see the field for the remainder of his time in Chicago. Haynes was released from the Bears as part of the 2006 roster cutdown.  He was signed by the New Orleans Saints and was declared inactive for one game before being released. On August 31, 2007, Haynes signed with the New York Jets. On September 1, 2007 the Jets cut him.

Personal life
He is the son of both Army and Air Force parents. He lived in many places around the world growing up including the Republic of Panama where he was coached in football by head coach, Louis Husted. While there he attended Balboa High School. After his parents relocated to McGuire Air Force Base in New Jersey, Haynes enrolled at Northern Burlington County Regional High School. He played volleyball, basketball, track, and football. He has an older brother, Curtis and a younger brother, Leshawn.

Haynes earned a Bachelor of Science in agricultural sciences from Penn State in 2003.

He currently is a high school football and soccer coach in Crowley, Texas.

References

External links
Michael Haynes ESPN Profile

1980 births
Living people
American football defensive linemen
Chicago Bears players
Penn State Nittany Lions football players
People from Brooklyn
People from Burlington County, New Jersey